The 1978 New York Cosmos season was the eighth season for the Cosmos in the now-defunct North American Soccer League. It was also the second and final year in which "New York" was dropped from their name. The double-winning club set records for most wins and points in an NASL season, thanks to their 24-6 regular-season mark (shared with the Vancouver Whitecaps) and 212 points, securing their second premiership on the way to their third championship. They beat the Fort Lauderdale Strikers 7–0 on opening day and never looked back, scoring 88 times while losing just three games in regulation. Giorgio Chinaglia scored 34 goals and 79 points, setting league records in the process. In Soccer Bowl '78, the Cosmos defeated the Tampa Bay Rowdies in front of 74,901 fans at Giants Stadium, still to this day a record for attendance at a North American championship soccer game.

Squad 

Source:

Results 
Source:

Friendlies 
Source:

Preseason

Regular season 
Pld = Games Played, W = Wins, L = Losses, GF = Goals For, GA = Goals Against, Pts = Points
6 points for a win, 1 point for a shootout win, 0 points for a loss, 1 point for each goal scored (up to three per game).

National Eastern Division Standings

Overall League Placing 

Source:

Matches 
 April 2 = New York Cosmos 7, Fort Lauredale Strikers 0 Giants Stadium 44,442
 April 9 = New York Cosmos 1, Los Angeles Aztecs 0 Rose Bowl 23,681
 April 16 = New York Cosmos 1, Tulsa Roughnecks 0 Giants Stadium 41,216
 April 23 = New York Cosmos 3, Dallas Tornado 1 Giants Stadium 50,127
 April 30 = New York Cosmos 5, Tampa Bay Rowdies 2 Tampa Stadium 41,888
 May 7 = New York Cosmos 2, Detroit Express 0 Giants Stadium 45,321
 May 14 = New York Cosmos 4, Colorado Caribous 3 Mile High Stadium 15,041
 May 17 = New York Cosmos 1, Portland Timbers 1 (Portland wins in a shootout) Civic Stadium 12,484
 May 21 = New York Cosmos 5, Seattle Sounders 1 Giants Stadium 71,219
 May 24 = Memphis Rogues 1, New York Cosmos 0 Liberty Bell Memorial Stadium 11,222
 May 28 = New York Cosmos 5, Rochester Lancers 1 Giants Stadium 41,305
 June 1 = New York Cosmos 5, Toronto Metros-Croatia 1 Varsity Stadium 16,233
 June 4 = New York Cosmos 3, Vancouver Whitecaps 2 Giants Stadium 44,675
 June 11 = New York Cosmos 1, Philadelphia Fury 0 Giants Stadium 42,385
 June 13 = New York cosmos 4, Minnesota Kicks 2 Metropolitan Stadium 46,370
 June 18 = New York Cosmos 6, Washington Diplomats 1 Giants Stadium 47,700

Postseason

Overview

Matches

References

See also
1978 North American Soccer League season
List of New York Cosmos seasons

Cosmos
New York Cosmos seasons
Cosmos
New York Cosmos
1978
Soccer Bowl champion seasons